Lars Larsen (1948–2019) was an entrepreneur and founder of the Jysk retail chain.

Lars Larsen may also refer to:

 Lars Larsen (1758–1844), Danish merchant, ship-owner and shipbuilder
 Lars Larsen (footballer, born 1951), Danish former footballer
 Lars Larsen (footballer, born 1978), Danish footballer for Randers FC
 Lars Larsen (footballer, born 1970), Danish footballer for Örebro SK
 Lars Olden Larsen (born 1998), Norwegian football midfielder
 Lars Holme Larsen, Danish designer

See also 
 Lars Larson (born 1959), American conservative talk radio show host
 Lars Larsson (disambiguation)